Thylactus is a genus of longhorn beetles of the subfamily Lamiinae, containing the following species:

 Thylactus analis Franz, 1954
 Thylactus angularis Pascoe, 1866
 Thylactus chinensis Kriesche, 1924
 Thylactus densepunctatus Chiang & Li, 1984
 Thylactus dentipennis Wang & Jiang, 1998
 Thylactus filipinus Vives, 2013
 Thylactus insignis Gahan, 1890
 Thylactus itzingeri Breuning, 1935
 Thylactus javanicus Breuning, 1935
 Thylactus kinduensis Breuning, 1950
 Thylactus lateralis Jordan, 1894
 Thylactus lettowvorbecki Kriesche, 1924
 Thylactus mjoebergi Aurivillius, 1925
 Thylactus pulawskii Hua, 1986
 Thylactus sikkimensis Breuning, 1938
 Thylactus simulans Gahan, 1890
 Thylactus sumatrensis Hüdepohl, 1987
 Thylactus umbilicatus Hüdepohl, 1990
 Thylactus uniformis Pic, 1934
 Thylactus zuberhoferi (Thomson, 1878)

References

Xylorhizini